The 2020 edition of the Pakistani Music television series Coke Studio, titled as Coke Studio 2020, commenced airing on 4 December 2020 and concluded on 25 December 2020. The season was produced by show's founder Rohail Hyatt and distributed by Coca-Cola Pakistan.

Coke Studio 2020 was opened by an all-female anthem "Na Tutteya Ve". The show is the shortest season in Coke Studio's history, with a total of 12 original songs released in the span of one month, accompanied by a revised video format. The revised video format was similar to Season 6's format.

Featured artists 

The season featured four emerging artists. Umair Jaswal made his eleventh appearance on the show and Bohemia returned after eight years.

Vocalists 

 Aizaz Sohail
 Ali Noor
 Ali Pervaiz Mehdi
 Bohemia
 Fariha Pervez
 Meesha Shafi
 Mehdi Maloof
 Rahat Fateh Ali Khan
 Sanam Marvi
 Sehar Gul Khan
 Umair Jaswal
 Wajeeha Naqvi
 Zara Madani

Backing Vocals 

 Kumail Jaffery
 Nimra Rafiq
 Shahab Hussain
 Wajiha Naqvi
 Zara Madani

Musicians 
Coke Studio 2020 saw collaborations with international musicians from around the world including Lebanon, Nepal, Turkey and Serbia.

Production 
The thirteenth edition of Coke Studio was going for a multi-producer format, many producers were on board including Haniya Aslam. Everything had been planned, set and halls were booked, artists had been confirmed and the show was few weeks away from final recordings. And then in May 2020, a Pakistani media reported that Coke Studio 13 is cancelled due to COVID-19 pandemic.

In October 2020 Coca-Cola Pakistan released an advertisement announcing the return of Coke Studio 2020, a special edition. The show was shortened after major budget cuts because of coronavirus pandemic. All of the rehearsals were done remotely, both singers and musicians were recorded separately due to COVID-19 SOPs. The season is referred as Coke Studio 2020 because of coronavirus pandemic. The season was produced by Rohail Hyatt's production company Frequency Media and distributed by Coca-Cola Pakistan.

Speaking at the launch of Coke Studio 2020, Rohail Hyatt said,

general manager of Coca-Cola Pakistan, Fahad Ashraf said,

Episodes 
Coke Studio 2020 did not feature any patriotic song. Coke Studio 2020 began airing on 4 December 2020 and concluded on 25 December 2020. An all-female anthem; Na Tutteya Ve was the season opener of Coke Studio 2020, the song speaks about the resilience of women. The season featured 12 original songs, all songs were arranged and produced by Rohail Hyatt.

Reception 
Nescafé Basement's producer and mentor Xulfi commended Na Tuttya Ve's rap part, he said' "Liked the edgy rap Meesha Shafi!". Xulfi also lauded the performance of Mehdi Maloof in Dil Khirki, he said "Mehdi Maloof just know every word of what you wrote is so many's inner circle voice. It's mine too. Emoted with the song at every moment". Pakistani-American rapper Bohemia applauded Meesha Shafi's performance in Coke Studio 2020 opener, Na Tuttya Ve. Bohemia said, "Coke Studio is off to a great start and who knew Meesha Shafi could drop that fire!"

Indian singer Daler Mehndi praised the performance of Ali Pervez Mehdi in Gal Sunn. In a video message Daler Mehndi said, "I am ecstatic! Ali Pervez Mehdi has sung an amazing track in Coke Studio. Like Ali, Meesha Shafi has done a brilliant job with Gal Sunn as well".

Notes and references

Notes

References

External links 
 
 

Season13
2020 Pakistani television series debuts